Daniel Mareček (born 30 May 1998) is a Czech footballer who plays as a midfielder for 1. FC Slovácko.

Club career

Sparta Prague
On 4 May 2016, Mareček made his senior team debut in Czech Cup against FK Jablonec at Generali Arena. On 13 February 2019, Mareček was loaned out to SK Dynamo České Budějovice for the rest of the season.

References

External links
Daniel Mareček at FAČR

Living people
1998 births
Czech footballers
Association football midfielders
Czech Republic youth international footballers
AC Sparta Prague players
FC Sellier & Bellot Vlašim players
SK Dynamo České Budějovice players
Czech First League players
Footballers from Prague